Idaholanx fresti, the Banbury Springs limpet or Banbury Springs lanx, is a rare species of freshwater snail, an aquatic gastropod mollusc in the family Lymnaeidae. It is the only species in the genus Idaholanx. First discovered in 1988, the species was formally described and named in 2017.

Distribution
This freshwater limpet is endemic to the US State of Idaho, where it is known from a 10-kilometer stretch of the Snake River. It is found in four complexes of springs along the Snake River in south-central Idaho: Thousand Springs, Box Canyon Springs, Banbury Hot Springs, and Briggs Springs.

Description
This snail is cinnamon red in color. The shell is conical in shape. It is up to 7.1 millimeters long by 6 wide and up to 4.3 millimeters tall.

This snail is similar in its morphology to species in the genus Lanx, but genetic analysis reveals that it is genetically more similar to the genus Fisherola.

Habitat

Idaholanx fresti lives in fast flowing, clean, cold water springs. It needs highly oxygenated water.

Conservation
In 1992 it was federally listed as an endangered species of the United States. This species is endemic to Idaho. It only exists at four places: Thousand Springs, Box Canyon Springs, Briggs Springs and Banbury Springs. It is threatened by habitat modification, spring flow reduction, groundwater quality, and invasive species.

Diet
Dead plants and diatoms.

References

External links
https://idfg.idaho.gov/species/taxa/25757

Endangered fauna of the United States
Lymnaeidae
Natural history of Idaho
Gastropods described in 2017
Monotypic gastropod genera